A. R. Winfield (d. 1887) was an American Methodist preacher. He was the editor of the Arkansas Methodist, and "one of the most widely known Methodist divines in the South." His obituary in the Arkansas Democrat read, "No minister of the gospel in Arkansas was so widely known."

References

External links
Rev Augustus Roberts Winfield on Find a Grave

1887 deaths
Southern Methodists
Methodism in Arkansas